The 1999 SEC Championship Game was won by the Alabama Crimson Tide 34–7 over the Florida Gators. The game was played in the Georgia Dome in Atlanta, Georgia, on December 4, 1999, and was televised to a national audience on ABC.

Scoring Summary

See also
 Alabama–Florida football rivalry

References

External links
Recap of the game from SECsports.com
Box score and statistics from RollTide.com
Box ccore and statistics from GatorZone.com

Championship Game
SEC Championship Game
Alabama Crimson Tide football games
Florida Gators football games
December 1999 sports events in the United States
1999 in sports in Georgia (U.S. state)
1999 in Atlanta